Paul Jiang Taoran (July 27, 1926 – November 15, 2010 Shijazhuang, Hebei, China) was the Roman Catholic bishop of the Roman Catholic Diocese of Zhengding. Ordained to the priesthood in 1953, he was ordained bishop by the Chinese Patriotic Catholic Association, without approval from the Vatican. However, in 2008, Pope Benedict XVI gave his approval.

Notes 

1926 births
2010 deaths
21st-century Roman Catholic bishops in China